Bucculatrix hobohmi is a moth in the  family Bucculatricidae. It was described by Wolfram Mey in 2004. It is found in Namibia.

References

External links
Natural History Museum Lepidoptera generic names catalog

Bucculatricidae
Moths described in 2004
Moths of Africa